William Milligan (1821–1892) was a Scottish theologian.

William Milligan may also refer to:
 William Lane Milligan (1795–1851), British military surgeon
 William Milligan, Lord Milligan (1898–1975), Scottish politician and judge
 Billy Milligan (1955–2014), American multiple personality
 Billy Milligan (baseball) (1878–1928), American baseball player

 ST1M (born 1986), Russian rapper also known as Billy Milligan